Anatoly Ivanovich Kovler (born 26 August 1948) is a Tajikistani-born Russian lawyer, former professor at the Academic Law University of the Russian Academy of Sciences and the judge of the European Court of Human Rights in respect of Russia. His term expired on 31 October 2012.

Early life
Kovler was born in Sari-Khassar, Tajikistan, then part of the Soviet Union. In 1966, he began studying at the Moscow State Institute of Foreign Relations (MGIMO), the diplomatic school of the Ministry of Foreign Affairs of Russia, and graduated with a diploma in 1971. From 1973 to 1978, he studied history at the Institute of Comparative Political Studies of the Russian Academy of Sciences, and in 1979 was appointed senior researcher at the institute.

Career
From 1980 to 1999, he was director of research at the Centre of Comparative Law of the Institute of State and Law of the Russian Academy of Sciences, being promoted in 1985 to professor of law and awarded the title of doctor of law in 1991. In 1999, he was elected by the Parliamentary Assembly of the Council of Europe to succeed Vladimir Tumanov as the judge of the European Court of Human Rights in respect of Russia. He was vice-president of its first section. His term at the court expired on 31 October 2012.

See also
European Court of Human Rights
List of judges of the European Court of Human Rights

References

External links
Website of the European Court of Human Rights

1948 births
Judges of the European Court of Human Rights
Russian judges
Moscow State Institute of International Relations alumni
Living people
Russian judges of international courts and tribunals
Academic staff of the Higher School of Economics